Soumaïla Coulibaly (born 15 April 1978) is a Malian former professional footballer who played as a midfielder. While playing for clubs such as Zamalek, SC Freiburg, and Borussia Mönchengladbach at club level, he scored six goals and made 67 appearances for the Mali national team from 1995 to 2009.

Career 
Coulibaly was born in Bamako, Mali.

On 8 July 2009, he signed a one-year contract for FSV Frankfurt after being released by Borussia Mönchengladbach. On 23 February 2010, he was released by FSV Frankfurt after playing only nine matches for the club.

On 8 May 2011, Coulibaly signed on a free transfer to play for Chinese League One team Yanbian FC.

Personal life 
Coulibaly is the brother of Boubacar Coulibaly and played with him for a long time at SC Freiburg.

Honours
Djoliba AC
Malian Première Division: 1995–96, 1996–97

Zamalek
Egypt Cup: 1998–99

SC Freiburg
2. Bundesliga: 2002–03

Borussia Mönchengladbach
2. Bundesliga: 2007–08

References

External links
 
 
 

1978 births
Living people
Sportspeople from Bamako
Malian footballers
Association football midfielders
Mali international footballers
2002 African Cup of Nations players
2004 African Cup of Nations players
Egyptian Premier League players
Bundesliga players
2. Bundesliga players
China League One players
Djoliba AC players
Zamalek SC players
SC Freiburg players
Borussia Mönchengladbach players
FSV Frankfurt players
Yanbian Funde F.C. players
Malian expatriate footballers
Malian expatriate sportspeople in Germany
Expatriate footballers in Germany
Malian expatriate sportspeople in Egypt
Expatriate footballers in Egypt
Malian expatriate sportspeople in China
Expatriate footballers in China
21st-century Malian people